This is a list of festivals in New Jersey.

January
 KotoriCon - anime convention at Gloucester County College

February
 Black Maria Film Festival

March
 Garden State Film Festival
 Jersey City Chili Cookoff

April
 Branch Brook Park Cherry Blossom Festival
 International Festival - Princeton University
 Lambertville Shad Festival
 Rock & Roll Steampunk Festival, Washington Borough, Warren County
 Rutgers Agricultural Field Day and New Jersey Folk Festival - Rutgers in New Brunswick, held on the last Saturday of April
 Trenton Computer Festival

May
 Annual Greek Festival - Greek Orthodox Church of St. George in Piscataway, held the weekend after Mother's Day; the state's and longest running Greek festival
 Crayfish Festival - Augusta -  Sussex County Fairgrounds
 Hoboken Arts and Music Festival  
 Jersey Shore Music Festival - Seaside Heights
 Montclair Film Festival - film festival in Montclair
 Munchmobile Hot Dog Showdown & Beer Festival - Monmouth Park Racetrack  in Oceanport
 NJ Greek Fest (The New Jersey Greek Festival) - Holy Trinity Greek Orthodox Church in Westfield, held the first weekend after Memorial Day
 New Jersey State History Festival - Washington Crossing State Park, held the first weekend in May
 Raritan River Music Festival

June
 AnimeNEXT - anime convention in Atlantic City
 Appel Farm Arts and Music Festival
 Beardfest Music & Arts Festival - NJ Pinelands National Reserve
 Belmar Seafood Festival
 BIG GREEK FESTIVAL  - Randolph June 7–9
 Celtic Festival - Historic Cold Spring Village in Cape May
 Cuban Parade of New Jersey
 Flemington OPA Festival - St. Anna Greek Orthodox Church
 Gay and Lesbian Pride Month
 Hoboken Film Festival
 Hungarian Festival - New Brunswick
 Jersey Shore Wine Festival - FirstEnergy Park, Lakewood, June 2 and 3
 McDonald's Gospelfest
 New Jersey Film Festival
 NJ Playwrights Festival
 Point Pleasant Summerfest in the Park - June 3
 Portugal Day Festival in Newark
 Red Bank Jazz & Blues Festival
 Sustainably Green Music & Arts Festival, Washington Borough, Warren County
 Tri-County Fair (Thursday-Sunday Father's Day weekend)

July
 All Points West Music & Arts Festival
 Pleasantville, New Jersey Colombia Festival - Orgullo Colombiano
 FARM Music & Arts Festival - Vernon, July 24–26
 Macy's Fireworks Spectacular - Independence Day
 Quick Chek New Jersey Festival of Ballooning - Thor Solberg Road in Readington, held the last weekend of July
 Shakespeare Theatre of New Jersey Outdoor Stage
 Soulsational Music Festival - Jersey Shore, held the last Saturday in July 
 St. Ann's Feast - Hoboken
 XPoNential Music Festival

August
 Chillfest
 Crab Cake Festival & Shore Chef Cook-Off - Monmouth Park Racetrack in Oceanport 
 Hambletonian Stakes
 Highlands Clam Festival - Highlands, held in the first week of August
 Jersey City Pride 
 Monmouth Film Festival
 New Jersey State Fair
 Newark Black Film Festival
 Philippine Fiesta - Meadowlands Exposition Center
 Quick Chek New Jersey Festival of Ballooning

September
 BBQ, Bets & Brews Festival - Monmouth Park Racetrack in Oceanport 
 Black Maria Film Festival
 Festival in the Borough, Washington NJ, Warren County
 First Annual Roseland Greek Festival - St. Nicholas, Constantine and Helen Greek Orthodox Church 
 Flemington OPA Festival - St. Anna Greek Orthodox Church
 Garden State Country Music & Food Truck Festival - Bader Airfield in Atlantic City
 Liberty Jazz Festival
 New Jersey Independent South Asian Cine Fest - New Brunswick 
 Revelation Generation
 Rib Rock, featuring B.B. King - PNC Bank Arts Center 
 South Mountain International Blues Festival - South Mountain Reservation in West Orange 
 Water and Wings Festival
 Youth Dance Festival of New Jersey
 Just Be You Performing Arts Film & Theater Festival

October
 AnimeNEXT
 Dia De Los Muertos Day of the Dead Celebration, Washington Borough, Warren County
 Festival of Fine Craft, Millville, New Jersey - Millville, on the first weekend in October
 Geraldine R. Dodge Poetry Festival
 Golden Door Film Festival
 Lima Bean Festival - West Cape May, on October 6
 MangaNEXT
 German American Volkvest

November
 Teaneck International Film Festival

December
 First Nights - celebrated on New Year's Eve, found throughout the state, including Montclair

Other
 The Bank of America New Jersey Fresh Seafood Festival - Atlantic City
 Cape May Strawberry Festival
 Navratri - India Square
 Slow Food Festival
 Ukrainian Festival

References

External links
New Jersey festivals at Foodreference.com
New Jersey festivals

New Jersey
 
Tourism in New Jersey
Festivals
New Jersey
Food festivals in New Jersey
New Jersey